Planica 1987 was a two day ski flying competition part of 1986/87 World Cup season, held from 14 to 15 March 1987 in Planica, SR Slovenia, Yugoslavia. Circa 100,000 people in total has gathered in three days.

Schedule

All jumps over 190 metres 
Chronological order:
192 metres (630 ft) – 13 March – Andreas Felder (WR touch, 2RD, Official training)
194 metres (636 ft) – 14 March – Piotr Fijas (WR, 3RD, canceled and repeated after)
191 metres (627 ft) – 14 March – Andreas Felder (repeated 3RD)
190 metres (623 ft) – 15 March – Ole Gunnar Fidjestøl (2RD)
193 metres (633 ft) – 15 March – Vegard Opaas (3RD, canceled after)

191 rule 
191 rule, proposed by founder of World Cup Torbjørn Yggeseth, which didn't score flights exceeding 191 metres (627 ft), was first time implemented. Piotr Fijas' 194 metres world record was officially recognized seven years later at the FIS meeting in Rio 1994.

World Cup
There were two individual ski flying events on Velikanka bratov Gorišek K185. By ski flying rules of that time there were three round of jumps, but only two best counted in a final result.

On 11 and 12 March 1987, trial jumpers were already testing the flying hill, while competition was training on the neighbour Bloudkova velikanka K130 hill.

On 13 March 1987, official training was scheduled at 10:00 AM with 18 Yugoslavian ski jumpers at the start. Felder touched the ground at 192 metres WR distance in the second training round in front of 10,000 people. Fijas landed at 189 metres.

Official training
Incomplete list and order — 10,000 people — 13 March 1987

 Invalid WR! Touch. Crash!

On 14 March 1987, first competition went quiet normal until the last round. It all started complicating in the third round after Piotr Fijas 194 metres world record distance in front of 40,000 people. After this jump jury canceled the third round and repeated it all over from the beginning from a lower gate. Then in the repeated round Andreas Felder, although with lower speed managed to land at 191 metres and won the competition.

On 15 March 1987, first two rounds of second competition went well until Vegard Opaas' jump at 193 metres. Jury canceled the competition right after this jump. Opaas was furious at technical delegate Torbjørn Yggeseth who robbed him of an almost certain victory, which would help him in a very tied World Cup overall battle with Ernst Vettori. Only one best jump of first two rounds counted as official result and Ole Gunnar Fidjestøl won the second competition.

First competition
WC #185 — Official results — 40,000 people — 14 March 1987

After Fijas' 194 m jump, 3rd round was canceled and repeated all over again.

Second competition
WC #186 — Official results — 50,000 people — 15 March 1987

After Opaas' 193 m, 3rd round canceled, 1 best of two rounds valid.

Ski flying world records
The all-time longest standing ski jump in parallel style ever.

 Not recognized! Touched the ground at world record distance.

References

1987 in Yugoslav sport
1987 in Slovenia
1987 in ski jumping
Ski jumping competitions in Yugoslavia
International sports competitions hosted by Yugoslavia
Ski jumping competitions in Slovenia
International sports competitions hosted by Slovenia
March 1987 sports events in Europe